Marcel Ophuls (born 1 November 1927) is a German-French documentary film maker and former actor, best known for his films The Sorrow and the Pity and Hôtel Terminus: The Life and Times of Klaus Barbie.

Life and career 
Ophuls was born in Frankfurt, Germany, the son of Hildegard Wall and the director Max Ophüls. His family left Germany in 1933 following the coming to power of the Nazi Party and settled in Paris, France. Following the invasion of France by Germany in May 1940 they were forced to flee to the Vichy zone, remaining in hiding for over a year before crossing the Pyrenees into Spain in order to travel to the United States, arriving there in December 1941. Marcel attended Hollywood High School, then Occidental College, Los Angeles. He spent a brief period serving in a U.S. Army theatrical unit in Japan in 1946, then studied at the University of California, Berkeley. Ophuls became a naturalized citizen of France in 1938, and of the United States in 1950.

When the family returned to Paris in 1950 Marcel became an assistant to Julien Duvivier and Anatole Litvak, and worked on John Huston's Moulin Rouge (1952) and his father's Lola Montès (1955). Through François Truffaut, Ophuls got to direct an episode of the portmanteau film Love at Twenty (1962). There followed the commercial hit Banana Peel (1964), a detective film starring Jeanne Moreau and Jean-Paul Belmondo.

With a slump in box-office fortunes, Ophuls turned to television news reporting and a documentary on the Munich crisis of 1938: Munich (1967). He then embarked on his examination of France under Nazi occupation, The Sorrow and the Pity. Although he enjoyed making entertaining films, Ophuls became identified as a documentarian, using a characteristically sober interview style to resolve disparate experiences into a persuasive argument. A Sense of Loss (1972) looked at Northern Ireland, and The Memory of Justice (1973) was an ambitious comparison of US policy in Vietnam and the atrocities of the Nazis. Disagreements with his French backers over interpretation led Ophuls to smuggle a print to New York where it was shown privately. Legal wrangles left him disappointed and financially broke, and Ophuls turned to university lecturing.

In the mid-1970s, he began producing documentaries for CBS and ABC. His feature documentary Hotel Terminus: The Life and Times of Klaus Barbie (1988) won an Academy Award; since then he has made an interview film with two senior East German Communists, November Days (1992) and a ruminative look at how journalists cover war, The Trouble We've Seen (1994).

Every year the IDFA (International Documentary Festival) in Amsterdam screens an acclaimed filmmaker's ten favorite films. In 2007, Iranian filmmaker Maziar Bahari selected The Sorrow and the Pity for his top ten classics from the history of documentary. At the 65th Berlin International Film Festival in February 2015 Ophuls received the Berlinale Camera award for his life work.

In 2014, Ophuls began crowd-sourcing funds for his new film Unpleasant Truths, about the continuing Israeli occupation of Palestinian territories, to be co-directed with Israeli filmmaker Eyal Sivan. In part, the film seeks to focus on possible links between the 2014 Israeli war on Gaza and the rise in anti-Semitism in Europe as well as whether "Islamophobia is the new anti-Semitism." It was originally intended as a collaboration with Jean-Luc Godard, who backed out early in the process; Godard makes an appearance as himself in the film. As of 2017, the film had not yet been completed due to unspecified financial and legal troubles, and may not be finished ever.

Umlaut
Marcel, like his father Max, prefers not to use the German umlaut in his name. Ophuls senior removed the umlaut when he took French citizenship, and Marcel has adopted the same spelling.

Filmography

As director
Matisse, ou Le talent du Bonheur (1960) (short)
Love at Twenty (1962)
Peau de banane (1963)
Fire at Will (1965)
Munich or Peace in our Time (1967)
The Harvest of My Lai (1970)
The Sorrow and the Pity (Le Chagrin et la pitié) (1969) – marked a turning point in the French debate about the Vichy Regime.
A Sense of Loss (1972) – on the Troubles in Northern Ireland.
The Memory of Justice (1973–76) - on the Nuremberg Trials, the Vietnam War, and the nature of war atrocity
Hôtel Terminus: The Life and Times of Klaus Barbie (1988) - winner of the Academy Award for Best Documentary Feature
November Days (1992)
Veillées d'armes (The Troubles We've Seen: A History of Journalism in Wartime) (1994)
Un Voyageur (2012) – self-portrait of the artist where Marcel Ophuls delivers his remembrances and sums up his experience

As actor
 Lola Montès (1955) - (uncredited)
 Egon Schiele – Exzess und Bestrafung (1980) - Dr. Stowel
 Festspiele (1982, TV Movie) - Clown
 Liberty Belle (1983) - Le professeur allemand
 Das schöne irre Judenmädchen (1984, TV Movie) - Medardus

Bibliography
The sorrow and the pity : a film by Marcel Ophüls, Introduction by Stanley Hoffmann. Filmscript translated by Mireille Johnston. Biographical and appendix material by Mireille Johnston, New York : Berkeley Publishing Corporation, 1975

See also
Hôtel Terminus

References

External links

Writings and interviews with Marcel Ophuls

1927 births
Living people
20th-century French Jews
French film directors
Jewish emigrants from Nazi Germany to the United States
German emigrants to France
German-language film directors
MacArthur Fellows
Directors of Best Documentary Feature Academy Award winners
Members of the Academy of Arts, Berlin